Mikalojus Radvila or Mikolaj I nicknamed the Old (c. 1450 – 16 July 1509) was a Lithuanian noble. He was known after a patronym Radvilaitis, made of his father's name Radvila, which in turn became a family name of his heirs, Radvilos, which later polonised as Radziwiłł.

Mikalojus had been a regent of Smolensk from 2 December 1481; in 1483 a 10,000-strong army was summoned by him for protection of Smolensk lands. He had been the Castellan of Trakai since 31 May 1488 and regent of Novgorodok, later a regent of Bielsk Podlaski. He was the Voivod of Vilnius since 1492 and the first Grand Chancellor of Lithuania from 1504 until his death in 1509. His sons Jerzy, Mikołaj, and Jan were the progenitors of the three Radziwiłł family lines. His daughter Anna was the great-grandmother of Elizabeth Báthory.

References
 Mikalojus Radvila

1450s births
1509 deaths
Radziwiłł family
Astikai family
15th-century Lithuanian people
16th-century Lithuanian people
Medieval Lithuanian nobility
Grand Chancellors of the Grand Duchy of Lithuania
Voivode of Vilnius